Mount Sourabaya is a mountain (915 m) 1 nautical mile (1.9 km) northwest of Mount Darnley, Bristol Island, in the South Sandwich Islands. Named by United Kingdom Antarctic Place-Names Committee (UK-APC) in 1971. The name refers to the whaling factory ship Sourabaya, from which an eruption of the island was witnessed in 1935.
The most recent eruption of Mount Sourabaya began between 19 April and 23 April 2016

References

:id:Gunung Sourabaya

Sourabaya, Mount